Aconitum lamarckii, known by the common name Northern wolf's-bane, is a species of herbaceous flowering plant of the genus Aconitum, in the buttercup family, Ranunculaceae. It is native to Europe and sometimes cultivated in gardens in temperate zones for its showy flowers. It blooms from early to late summer with yellow flowers produced on tall, thin, somewhat lax stems.

Etymology
The plant is named after Jean-Baptiste Lamarck.

References

lamarckii
Flora of Europe
Jean-Baptiste Lamarck